The 2005 Cornell Big Red football team represented Cornell University in the 2005 NCAA Division I-AA football season as a member of the Ivy League. They were led by second-year head coach Jim Knowles and played their home games at Schoellkopf Field. Cornell finished the season 6–4 overall and 4–3 in Ivy League play.

Schedule

References

Cornell
Cornell Big Red football seasons
Cornell Big Red football